Ocaklı is a quarter of the town of Haydarlı, Dinar District, Afyonkarahisar Province in Turkey. Its population is 340 (2021).

References

Dinar District